Anett Kontaveit and Ilona Kremen were the defending champions, but Kontaveit chose to participate at the 2015 Lale Cup instead whilst Kremen chose not to participate.

Johanna Konta and Maria Sanchez won the title, defeating the second seeds Paula Cristina Gonçalves and Petra Krejsová in the final, 6–3, 6–4.

Seeds

Draw

References 
 Draw

Hardee's Pro Classic - Doubles
Hardee's Pro Classic